Klåholmen is a village in Tvedestrand municipality in Agder county, Norway. The village is located on the island of Sandøya, midway between the popular tourist destinations of Kilsund and Lyngør.

References

Villages in Agder
Tvedestrand